Buck Owens was an American singer and guitarist.

Buck Owens may also refer to:
Buck Owens (1960 album)
Buck Owens (1961 album)
"Buck Owens", a song by Melvins from the 1996 album Stag